Role model is a sociological term.

Role Model or Role Models may also refer to:

Film and television
 "Role Model" (House), a 2005 episode of the TV program House
 Role Models, a 2008 comedy film
 Role Models (2017 film), Indian Malayalam-language comedy-drama film

Literature
 Role Models, a 2010 memoir by John Waters

Music
 Role Model (singer), American singer-songwriter and former rapper
 "Role Model" (song), a 1999 song by Eminem
 Role Model (Cex album), 2000
 Role Model (Bodyjar album), 2013
 "Role Model", a 2014 song by Ronnie Radke from the mixtape Watch Me
 "Role Models", a 2018 song by AJR from the album The Click (Deluxe Edition)